The 26 class (formerly I.17 class) was a class of steam locomotives built by Dübs and Company for the New South Wales Government Railways of Australia.

History
Dübs and Company were contracted to supply 20 large mineral tank locomotives, the design of which included the fitting of a Webb radial axle at the bunker end. The locomotives were delivered in the early months of 1892.

Originally intended for assisting freight trains over the Blue Mountains line, they were found unsatisfactory due to insufficient water capacity and inflexibility around tight curves. Several were sent to Waterfall for working coal and blue metal trains. Shunting at Darling Harbour and Alexandria goods yards was the duty of the remainder of those based in Sydney. Others were stationed at the old Hamilton locomotive depot for working trains from the interchange with the South Maitland Railway at East Greta to Newcastle.

Although replaced in 1905 by larger locomotives between Waterfall and Sydney, they continued to haul coal hopper wagons to Waterfall and, additionally were used to assist northbound trains through Otford Tunnel. At holiday times, some of these locomotives were transferred to working picnic trains to The National Park. 

During the 1920s, most of the class was withdrawn. After several years out of use, were returned to traffic as shunters, particularly at western centres such as Lithgow, Bathurst and Orange. Several were sent to Albury to assist at this busy break-of-gauge station and others to Port Kembla.

From 1942 until 1956, two of the class were engaged in shunting carriages at Sydney Central Station. They were removed when overhead wiring was installed as using the water columns was a hazard owing to the location of the inlet.

The first was withdrawn in September 1956 with only nine remaining by 1961. The final two representatives of the class in service were 2604 and 2606, which were to be found at Bathurst until 1970.

Preservation

Gallery

See also
 26 Class Steam Locomotive Specifications and Photos at Railpage
 NSWGR steam locomotive classification

References

2-6-2T locomotives
Dübs locomotives
Railway locomotives introduced in 1892
26
Standard gauge locomotives of Australia